Paul de Arzila (Arzila Bog) is a Portuguese natural reserve occupying an area in Coimbra municipality (in Arzila), and neighbouring municipalities of Condeixa-a-Nova and Montemor-o-Velho. It is a biogenetical reserve with an area of 150 ha framed in a protected area of 535 ha, where 119 species of birds, 12 of mammals, 10 of reptiles, 13 of fish and 201 of spiders were inventoried.

References

Nature conservation in Portugal
Nature reserves in Portugal
Ramsar sites in Portugal
Geography of Coimbra District
Tourist attractions in Coimbra District
Coimbra
Montemor-o-Velho